Drosophila malayana is a species of fly in the subgenus Dudaica.

References 

malayana